Sykies or Sykeai (Συκεαί) is a suburb of the Thessaloniki Urban Area and was a former municipality in the regional unit of Thessaloniki, Greece. Since the 2011 local government reform it is part of the municipality Neapoli-Sykies, of which it is the seat and a municipal unit. The municipal unit population is 37,753 (2011 census). Its land area is 7.982 km².

History
Sykies was mostly built after settling of refugees from Asia Minor in 1922. The refugees were mostly from Rodochori of Asia Minor. The new residents built a new church that dedicated to patron saints from their origin places.

A part of the district is named Varna built by Greeks from Varna, modern Bulgaria. Other areas include Kallithea, Riga Feraiou and Heptapyrgiou.

In 1934 the municipality of Thessaloniki was divided in smallest administrative units, so Sykies became a separate community. In 1954 the community of Sykies changed to municipality. Today it is part of Neapoli-Sykies municipality.

Culture

Sports
Sykies is the seat of many clubs. The most famous of them is VAO, a long-standing club with achievements in several sports.

References

External links
Official website 

Populated places in Thessaloniki (regional unit)